The Democratic National Party (DEK), was a far-right nationalist political party in Cyprus that advocated the union of Cyprus and Greece (Enosis).

The Democratic National Party was founded in May 1968 by Takis Evdokas and participated 1970 and 1976 elections in Cyprus. The DEK was merged to Democratic Rally (DISY) in 1977.

References

1968 establishments in Cyprus
Greek Cypriot nationalism
Political parties established in 1968
Political parties disestablished in 1977
Far-right political parties in Cyprus
Defunct political parties in Cyprus